Hannant is a surname. Notable people with the surname include:

Beaumont Hannant (born  1970), English musician, producer, and DJ
Ben Hannant (born 1984), Australian rugby league footballer
Brian Hannant (born 1940), Australian film director
Laura Hannant (born 1985), Canadian activist